Cooley is a surname of Anglo-Saxon and Irish origin.

 Bertram Cooley (1874–1935), South African cricketer
 Charles Cooley (1864–1929), American sociologist
 Chelsea Cooley (born 1983), Miss USA 2005
 Chris Cooley (born 1982), American professional football player
 David P. Cooley (1960–2009), American test pilot
 Dennis Cooley (born 1944), Canadian poet, professor at the University of Manitoba
 Denton Cooley (1920−2016), American physician and heart surgeon
 Ed Cooley (born 1969), American college basketball coach
 Haskell Cooley, member of American southern gospel quartet The Cathedrals
 Horace S. Cooley (1806-1850), American politician
 Jack Cooley (born 1991), American basketball player
 Jacquelin Smith Cooley (1883–1965), American botanist and mycologist
 James Cooley (1926-2016), American mathematician, developer of the Cooley–Tukey fast Fourier transform
 Jodi Cooley, American physicist
 Joe Cooley (1924–1973), Irish accordionist
 John K. Cooley (1927–2008), American journalist and author, specializing in terrorism and the Middle East
 Logan Cooley (born 2004), American ice hockey player
 Lou Cooley (dates unknown), American 19th-century gunfighter, friend of Wyatt Earp at the time of the Gunfight at the O.K. Corral (1881)
 Mason Cooley (1927–2002), American aphorist
 Mike Cooley (engineer) (born 1934), Irish-born engineer and workplace activist
 Mike Cooley (football coach) (c. 1920–1988), American football coach
 Mike Cooley (musician) (born 1966), American guitarist/singer/lyricist, and co-founder of the rock/alt country band, Drive-By Truckers
 Rita Nealon Cooley (1919/1920–2006), American political scientist
 Rusty Cooley, American guitarist
 Ryan Cooley (born 1988), Canadian television actor
 Spade Cooley (1910–1969), American western swing musician, murdered his wife
 Stephen Cooley (born 1947), American prosecutor for Los Angeles County
 Thomas B. Cooley (1871–1945), American Pediatrician, first described β-thalassemia
 Thomas F. Cooley, American professor of economics at the New York University Stern School of Business
 Thomas M. Cooley (1824–1898), American jurist, Chief Justice of the Michigan Supreme Court
 Tonya Cooley (born 1980), American actress and reality television personality
 Troy Cooley (born 1965), cricketer for the Tasmanian Tigers
 Wes Cooley (motorcyclist) (born 1956), American motorcycle racer
 Wes Cooley (politician) (1932-2015), American politician, congressman from Oregon
 William Cooley (1783–1863), American settler in Florida
 William Desborough Cooley (1795?–1883), Irish geographer
 William T. Cooley (born 1966), American major general in the United States Air Force
 Winnifred Harper Cooley (1874–1967), American feminist author

References